Karnah is an administrative tehsil in the Kupwara district of the Indian union territory of Jammu and Kashmir.

Demographics
Karnah tehsil has a total population of 60,129 as per the Census 2011, of which 34,471 are males while 25,658 are females, giving a sex rationratio of 744 females per 1,000 males. In 2011 there were total 11,422 families residing in Karnah Tehsil. Paharis form a majority population in the tehsil. As per Census 2011 out of the total population, 25.8% live in urban areas while 74.2% live in rural areas. The average literacy rate in urban areas is 68.4% while that in the rural  is 59.9%. Also, the sex ratio of urban areas in the tehsil is 587 while that of rural areas is 807.

References

Villages in Kupwara district